Valeria Viktorovna Pavlova (born 15 April 1995) is a Russian ice hockey player, a member of the Russian national team and the captain of Biryusa Krasnoyarsk in the Zhenskaya Hockey League (ZhHL).

She has been a member of the Russian national team since 2011 and has represented Russia at six IIHF Women's World Championships, in 2012, 2013,  2015, 2016, 2019, and 2021 and in the women's ice hockey tournament at the 2018 Winter Olympics, and won gold medals in the women's ice hockey tournaments at the Winter Universiades in 2015 and 2019.

References

External links

1995 births
Living people
Russian women's ice hockey forwards
People from Tyumen
Universiade medalists in ice hockey
Ice hockey players at the 2018 Winter Olympics
Ice hockey players at the 2022 Winter Olympics
Olympic ice hockey players of Russia
Universiade gold medalists for Russia
Competitors at the 2015 Winter Universiade
Competitors at the 2019 Winter Universiade
Biryusa Krasnoyarsk players
Sportspeople from Tyumen Oblast